Carmarthen West and South Pembrokeshire may refer to:

 Carmarthen West and South Pembrokeshire (UK Parliament constituency)
 Carmarthen West and South Pembrokeshire (Senedd constituency)